Andro Vlahušić (born 17 May 1960) is a Croatian physician and politician. A member of the Croatian People's Party (HNS), Vlahušić was a member of the Croatian Parliament (2000–2001) and Minister of Health in the second cabinet of Prime Minister Ivica Račan (2001–2003). From 2009 to 2017 he served as Mayor of Dubrovnik.

References

1960 births
Living people
Croatian physicians
Representatives in the modern Croatian Parliament
Croatian People's Party – Liberal Democrats politicians
School of Medicine, University of Zagreb alumni
Health ministers of Croatia
Mayors of Dubrovnik